The Dyce stones are a collection of Pictish and Early Medieval sculptured stones that are housed in a shelter in the ruined St Fergus's Chapel, Dyce, Aberdeen, Scotland. There are two larger stones, known as Dyce I and Dyce II, that bear idiomatically Pictish symbols, as well as several smaller sculptured stones.

Dyce I
This is a Class I stone, bearing incised Pictish symbols. The symbols are the Pictish Beast and the Double disc and z-rod.

Dyce II
This is a Class II cross slab bearing a celtic cross decorated with knotwork and a central boss with spiral work. round the base of the cross are the Crescent and v-rod, Double disc and z-rod, triple disc and mirror case. On the side is an ogham inscription that transliterates as:
EOTTASSARRHETODDEDDOTS MAQQ ROGODDADD

Gallery

References

Pictish stones
Historic Scotland properties in Aberdeenshire